Harry C. and Jessie F. Franzheim House is a historic home located on Wheeling Island at Wheeling.  It was built in 1897, and is a three-story shingle style dwelling.  It sits on a sandstone foundation. It features a cross gambrel roof with a long slope, two round towers with curved-glass windows, and a wide front porch with Ionic order columns.

It was listed on the National Register of Historic Places in 1989. It is located in the Wheeling Island Historic District.

References

Houses in Wheeling, West Virginia
Houses on the National Register of Historic Places in West Virginia
Shingle Style architecture in West Virginia
Houses completed in 1897
National Register of Historic Places in Wheeling, West Virginia
Bungalow architecture in West Virginia
American Craftsman architecture in West Virginia
Individually listed contributing properties to historic districts on the National Register in West Virginia